The 2021–22 Minnesota Golden Gophers women's basketball team represented the University of Minnesota during the 2021–22 NCAA Division I women's basketball season. The Golden Gophers, led by fourth-year head coach Lindsay Whalen, played their home games at Williams Arena and compete as members of the Big Ten Conference.

The Golden Gophers are currently 14-17 and 7–11 in Big Ten play to finish in tenth place. As the tenth seed in the Big Ten tournament, they were defeated by Northwestern in the second round. They were not invited to the NCAA Tournament, but were chosen as an at-large team for the WNIT.

Previous season
The Golden Gophers finished the season 8–13 and 7–11 in Big Ten play to finish in tenth place.  As the ninth seed in the Big Ten tournament, they were defeated by Nebraska in the second round.  They were not invited to the NCAA tournament or the WNIT.

Offseason

Departures

Arrivals

2021 Recruiting Class

Katie Borowicz was originally a member of the 2021 Recruiting Class. She enrolled at the University of Minnesota early and joined the team for the 2020-21 Season.

Roster

Schedule and results

|-
! colspan=6 style=| Exhibition

|-
! colspan=6 style=| Regular season

|-
! colspan=6 style=|Big Ten Women's tournament

|-
! colspan=6 style=|WNIT

Source

Rankings

See also
2021–22 Minnesota Golden Gophers men's basketball team

References

Minnesota Golden Gophers women's basketball seasons
Minnesota
Minnesota Golden Gophers women's basketball team
Minnesota Golden Gophers women's basketball team
Minnesota